Cohesion may refer to:
 Cohesion (chemistry), the intermolecular attraction between like-molecules
 Cohesion (computer science), a measure of how well the lines of source code within a module work together
 Cohesion (geology), the part of shear strength that is independent of the normal effective stress in mass movements
 Cohesion (linguistics), the linguistic elements that make a discourse semantically coherent
 Cohesion (social policy), the bonds between members of a community or society and life
 Cohesion (album), the fourth studio album by Australian band Gyroscope
 Cohesion (band), a musical group from Surrey, England

See also 
 Community cohesion
 Structural cohesion
 Cohesion number
 Adhesion (disambiguation)
 Coherence (disambiguation)